Luçije Gjini (born 2 May 1994) is an Albanian football midfielder currently playing for KF Vllaznia Shkodër.

See also
List of Albania women's international footballers

References

External links 
 
 

1994 births
Living people
Footballers from Durrës
Albanian footballers
Albanian women's footballers
Women's association football midfielders
KFF Vllaznia Shkodër players
Albania women's international footballers